An apochromat, or apochromatic lens (apo), is a photographic or other lens that has better correction of chromatic and spherical aberration than the much more common achromat lenses.

Explanation
Chromatic aberration is the phenomenon of different colors focusing at different distances from a lens. In photography, chromatic aberration produces soft overall images, and color fringing at high-contrast edges, like an edge between black and white. Astronomers face similar problems, particularly with telescopes that use lenses rather than mirrors. Achromatic lenses are corrected to bring two wavelengths into focus in the same plane – typically red (~0.590 µm) and blue (~0.495 µm). Apochromatic lenses are designed to bring three colors into focus in the same plane – typically red (~0.620 µm), green (~0.530 µm), and blue (~0.465 µm). The residual color error (secondary spectrum) can be up to an order of magnitude less than for an achromatic lens of equivalent aperture and focal length. Apochromats are also corrected for spherical aberration at two wavelengths, rather than one as in an achromat.

Telescope objective lenses for wide-band digital imaging in astronomy must have apochromatic correction, as the optical sensitivity of typical CCD imaging arrays can extend from the ultraviolet through the visible spectrum and into the near infrared wavelength range. Focused and guided properly during the exposure, these apochromatic objectives are capable of producing the sharpest wide-field astrophotographs optically possible for the given aperture sizes.

Graphic arts process (copy) cameras generally use apochromatic lenses for sharpest possible imagery as well. Classically designed apochromatic process camera lenses generally have a maximum aperture limited to about 9. More recently, higher-speed apochromatic lenses have been produced for medium format, digital and 35 mm cameras.

Apochromatic designs require optical glasses with special dispersive properties to achieve three color crossings. This is usually achieved using costly fluoro-crown glasses, abnormal flint glasses, and even optically transparent liquids with highly unusual dispersive properties in the thin spaces between glass elements. The temperature dependence of glass and liquid index of refraction and dispersion must be accounted for during apochromat design to assure good optical performance over reasonable temperature ranges with only slight re-focusing. In some cases, apochromatic designs without anomalous dispersion glasses are possible.

Usage in photography
Independent tests can be used to demonstrate that the "APO" designation is used rather loosely by some photographic lens manufacturers to describe the color accuracy of their lenses, as comparable lenses have shown superior color accuracy even though they did not carry the "APO" designation.

Also, when considering lens design, the "APO" designation is used more conservatively in astronomy-related optics (e.g. telescopes) and microscopy than in photography. For example, telescopes that are marked "APO" are specialized, fixed focal length lenses that are optimised for infinity-like distances whereas in photography, even certain relatively low-priced general-purpose zoom lenses are given the APO designation.

See also

 Superachromat
 Fluorite lens
 List of telescope types

References

Lenses